is a Japanese-style fried chicken burger sold and trademarked by McDonald’s Japan.

 indicates a way of cooking using deep frying. After marinating meat or fish, the meat is sprinkled with Japanese katakuri-ko (potato starch) before frying. Corn starch is also used if katakuriko is unavailable. Tatsuta dishes are cooked with pork, mackerel or whale as well. They can also be served for lunch with bread as a kind of sandwich or bun.

See also 
 Tonkatsu
 Japanese cuisine
 Fried chicken

References

Japanese chicken dishes